Eryngium foetidum is a tropical perennial herb in the family Apiaceae. Common names include culantro ( or ), recao, chadon beni (pronounced shadow benny), Mexican coriander, bhandhania, long coriander, sawtooth coriander, and ngò gai. It is native to Mexico, the Caribbean, and Central and South America, but is cultivated worldwide, mostly in the tropics as a perennial, but sometimes in temperate climates as an annual.

In the United States, the common name culantro sometimes causes confusion with cilantro, a common name for the leaves of Coriandrum sativum (also in Apiaceae but in a different genus), of which culantro is said to taste like a stronger version.

Uses

Culinary
Eryngium foetidum is widely used in seasoning, marinating and garnishing in the Caribbean (particularly in Cuba, the Dominican Republic, Puerto Rico, and Trinidad and Tobago), as well as El Salvador, Nicaragua, Panama, Costa Rica, Guyana, Suriname, Ecuador, and in Brazil's and Peru's Amazon regions. It is also used extensively as a culinary herb in Cambodia, Thailand, India, Nepal, Vietnam, Laos, Myanmar, southwestern China and other parts of tropical Asia. It is sometimes used as a substitute for coriander leaves, but has a stronger taste. Unlike coriander, Eryngium foetidum dries well, retaining good color and flavor, which makes it valuable in the dried herb industry. 

In the United States, E. foetidum grows naturally in Florida, Georgia, Hawaii, Puerto Rico, and the Virgin Islands.

Traditional medicine

Eryngium foetidum has been used in traditional medicine in tropical regions for burns, earache, fevers, hypertension, constipation, fits, asthma, stomachache, worms, infertility complications, snake bites, diarrhea, and malaria.

Eryngium foetidum is also known as E. antihystericum. The specific name antihystericum reflects the fact that this plant has traditionally been used for epilepsy. The plant is said to calm a person's 'spirit' and thus prevents epileptic 'fits', so is known by the common names spiritweed and fitweed. The anticonvulsant properties of this plant have been scientifically investigated.  A decoction of the leaves has been shown to exhibit anti-inflammatory and analgesic effects in rats.

Eryngial is a chemical compound isolated from E. foetidum. The University of the West Indies at Mona, Jamaica, has investigated the use of eryngial as a treatment for human Strongyloides stercoralis infection (strongyloidiasis).

It is used as an ethnomedicinal plant for the treatment of a number of ailments such as fevers, chills, vomiting, burns, fevers, hypertension, headache, earache, stomachache, asthma, arthritis, snake bites, scorpion stings, diarrhea, malaria and epilepsy. The main constituent of essential oil of the plant is eryngial (E-2-dodecenal). A pharmacological investigation claims to have demonstrated anthelmintic, anti-inflammatory, analgesic, anticonvulsant, anticlastogenic, anticarcinogenic, antidiabetic, and antibacterial activity.

Chemistry 
Qualitative analysis of the leaves demonstrated the presence of tannins and saponin, as well as some flavonoids; no alkaloids have been reported yet. Caffeic acid, chlorogenic acid (CGA), and kaempferol have been among the phenolic compounds found in E. foetidum leaves.

See also

 Cuban cuisine
 Cuisine of the Dominican Republic
 List of culinary herbs and spices
 Mizo cuisine
 Puerto Rican cuisine
 Thai cuisine
 Trinidad and Tobago cuisine
 Vietnamese cuisine

References

External links

Long coriander (Eryngium foetidum L.) page from Gernot Katzer's Spice Pages

Edible Apiaceae
Herbs
Medicinal plants of Central America
Medicinal plants of North America
Medicinal plants of South America
foetidum
Plants described in 1753
Taxa named by Carl Linnaeus